Trevor Richards may refer to:
 Trevor Richards (baseball) (born 1993), American baseball pitcher
 Trevor Richards (musician) (born 1945), English drummer